Léon Martin Fourichon (10 January 1809, Thiviers – 24 November 1884, Paris) was a French naval officer, colonial administrator and politician.

Life
He entered the navy in 1824, rising to aspirant on 20 September 1826, enseigne de vaisseau on 19 March 1829, lieutenant de vaisseau on 16 May 1833, capitaine de frégate on 1 November 1843, capitaine de vaisseau on 22 July 1848, contre-amiral on 26 February 1853 and vice-amiral on 17 August 1859. He was kept on the active list indefinitely.

He was governor of French Guiana from 1853 to 1854 and Minister for the Navy and the Colonies from 1870 to 1871 and 1876 to 1877. He was also a deputy for the Dordogne from 1871 to 1876 and a 'sénateur inamovible' from 1876 to 1884. He  belonged to the Orléanist parliamentary group, Centre droit.

Bibliography
Annuaire de la Marine et des Colonies 1 January 1881.

External links
http://www.assemblee-nationale.fr/gouv_parl/result.asp?regle_nom=%5Bchoisir+une+option%5D&Nom=&vip=categorie&poste=Marine&choixdate=intervalle&DebutMin=&FinMin=&Dateau=&choixordre=chrono&Rechercher=Rechercher

1809 births
1884 deaths
People from Dordogne
Politicians from Nouvelle-Aquitaine
Orléanists
French Naval Ministers
Members of the National Assembly (1871)
French life senators
Governors of French Guiana
French Navy officers